The Geiger HDP 13.5 is a German electric motor for powering electric aircraft, designed and produced by Geiger Engineering of Seigendorf, Hirschaid, Oberfranken.

Design and development
The HDP 13.5 is a brushless 58 volt design producing , with an outrunner coil.  It has a 93% efficiency. The low working rpm of the engine means that it can turn a propeller at efficient speeds without the need for a reduction drive.

Specifications (HDP 13.5)

See also

References

External links

Aircraft electric engines